Markle is a hamlet in East Lothian, Scotland,  East of Edinburgh and close to the village of East Linton. It is the site of the former Markle Castle.

References 

Villages in East Lothian